Reed Creek is a  long 3rd order tributary to the Deep River in Randolph County, North Carolina.

Course
Reed Creek rises about 1.5 miles west of Staley, North Carolina in Randolph County, North Carolina and then flows southwesterly to join the Deep River about 1 mile south of Ramseur, North Carolina.

Watershed
Reed Creek drains  of area, receives about 47.2 in/year of precipitation, and has a wetness index of 404.77 and is about 38% forested.

See also
List of rivers of North Carolina

References

Rivers of North Carolina
Rivers of Randolph County, North Carolina